The UCF Knights football statistical leaders are individual statistical leaders of the UCF Knights football program in various categories, including passing, rushing, receiving, total offense, defensive stats, and kicking. Within those areas, the lists identify single-game, single-season, and career leaders. The Knights represent the University of Central Florida in the NCAA Division I FBS American Athletic Conference through the 2022 season, after which UCF will join the Big 12 Conference.

UCF began competing in intercollegiate football in 1979. Unlike many college football teams that began play much earlier, all of UCF's full box scores are available, meaning there is no pre-modern era of incomplete statistics.

These lists are updated through UCF's game against Boise State on September 2, 2021.

Passing

Passing yards

Passing touchdowns

Rushing

Rushing yards

Rushing touchdowns

Receiving

Receptions

Receiving yards

Receiving touchdowns

Total offense
Total offense is the sum of passing and rushing statistics. It does not include receiving or returns.

Total offense yards

Touchdowns responsible for 
"Touchdowns responsible for" is the official NCAA term for combined passing and rushing touchdowns.

Defense

Interceptions

Tackles

Sacks

Kicking

Field goals made

Field goal percentage

References

UCF